Neila Gonji (born 18 September 1959) is a Tunisian politician. She is currently Minister of Industry, Energy and Mines in the Bouden Government.

References 

Living people
1959 births
Women government ministers of Tunisia
21st-century Tunisian women politicians
21st-century Tunisian politicians
Independent politicians in Tunisia
Industry ministers of Tunisia
Energy and mines ministers of Tunisia